Oskar Lindblom (born 15 August 1996) is a Swedish professional ice hockey forward for the San Jose Sharks of the National Hockey League (NHL).

Early life
Lindblom was born on 15 August 1996 in Gävle, Sweden. One of his childhood idols was Washington Capitals player Nicklas Bäckström, also from Gävle. Lindblom's father Johan played for several Swedish hockey teams. Lindblom and his two brothers, Marcus and Linus, began playing hockey at a young age, helped by their father.

All three brothers began playing hockey in the Brynäs IF junior ice hockey system. He was named as captain for the Brynäs under-16 team in the 2011–12 season, but was promoted to the under-18 team after scoring 18 points in nine games. He made two appearances at the TV-pucken tournament, playing for Gästrikland in 2011 and 2012. In his first year, Lindblom was second on the team in goals (four) and points (seven). The next year, as alternate captain, he scored 20 points in eight games, the second-highest of anyone in the tournament. Going into the draft, Lindblom had 13 goals and 33 points in 43 games with Brynäs in the J20 SuperElit, the highest level of junior play in Sweden.

Playing career
Lindblom's career began with Brynäs IF, where he played on the U16, U18 and U20 junior teams. Beginning with the 2014–15 season, his outstanding play earned him a spot on their professional team who compete in the Swedish Hockey League, the country's top division. Lindblom was selected by Lokomotiv Yaroslavl in the 5th round (163rd overall) of the 2013 KHL Junior Draft. He was selected by the Philadelphia Flyers in the fifth round (138th overall) of the 2014 NHL Entry Draft. In the 2016–17 season with Brynäs IF, Lindblom finished fourth in scoring league-wide with 47 points in 52 games. He was named Forward of the Year at the end of the season.

Philadelphia Flyers
On 30 May 2017, Lindblom was signed to a three-year, entry-level contract with the Philadelphia Flyers. He was then assigned to the Flyers American Hockey League (AHL) affiliate, the Lehigh Valley Phantoms. On 18 January 2018, Lindblom was selected to replace Phantoms teammate Danick Martel at the 2018 AHL All-Star game. Lindblom was called up to the NHL for the first time on 19 February 2018, and played his first career NHL game two days later against the Montreal Canadiens. He recorded his first NHL point on 17 March against the Carolina Hurricanes. The next day against the Washington Capitals, Lindblom scored his first career NHL goal in a 6–3 win. Following the Flyers defeat in Round 1 of the 2018 Stanley Cup playoffs, Lindblom was loaned to the Phantoms to play in their post-season.

On 13 December 2019, Lindblom was diagnosed with Ewing's sarcoma, a form of bone cancer. The diagnosis was expected to effectively end his season. On 2 July 2020, Lindblom completed his chemotherapy treatments. Following his cancer battle, Lindblom was named as one of three finalists for the 2019–20 Masterton Trophy alongside Bobby Ryan and Stephen Johns.

On 22 July 2020, the Flyers signed Lindblom to a three-year, $9 million contract extension. On 3 September, Lindblom returned to play in a Game 6 victory against the New York Islanders. He spent 17:30 minutes on ice, which included three shot attempts, two hits and one block.

On 18 April 2021, the Flyers honored Lindblom at their annual Hockey Fights Cancer game, his first since returning to play post-cancer diagnosis and treatment. After the regular season Lindblom was announced as a finalist for the Masterton Trophy for the second consecutive year, and on 15 June, he was named as winner of the trophy.

Following the 2021–22 season, in a move that was panned by both reporters and fans, the Flyers bought out the remainder of Lindblom's contract with one year remaining.

San Jose Sharks
On 13 July 2022, Lindblom signed as a free agent to a two-year, $5 million contract with the San Jose Sharks.

International play

Lindblom competed as a member of Team Sweden at the 2013 World U-17 Hockey Challenge, where he led Sweden to a Gold Medal as the tournament's leading scorer.

On 9 May 2019, Lindblom was named to make his senior international debut with Sweden at the 2019 World Championships held in Bratislava, Slovakia.

Personal life
Lindblom's older brother Marcus plays for Strömsbro IF of Hockeyettan. Their younger brother Linus plays in the Brynäs IF system.

Career statistics

Regular season and playoffs

International

Awards and honours

References

External links

1996 births
Living people
Bill Masterton Memorial Trophy winners
Brynäs IF players
Lehigh Valley Phantoms players
People from Gävle
Philadelphia Flyers draft picks
Philadelphia Flyers players
San Jose Sharks players
Swedish ice hockey left wingers
Sportspeople from Gävleborg County
Swedish expatriate ice hockey players in the United States